Indiara is a city and municipality in central-south Goiás state, Brazil. Indiara is a large producer of soybeans and cotton.

Location
Indiara is in the Vale do Rio dos Bois and has municipal boundaries with:
north:  Palmeiras de Goiás
south:  Edéia
east:  Cezarina
west:  Jandaia and Acreúna

Indiara is 102 kilometers (southwest) from the state capital, Goiânia and is on the edge of highway BR-060 
(passing through Guapó and Cezarina).

Political data
Eligible voters: 9,310 (12/2007)
Mayor: José Vilmar da Fonseca (January 2005)
Vice-mayor: Antônio Telesforo de Almeida
Councilmembers: 9

Demographic data
Population density: 13.28 inhabitants/km2 (2007)
Population growth rate 2000/2007: 1.04%
Urban population in 2007: 10,408     
Rural population in 2007: 2,295

Ranking on the municipal Human Development Index, 2000
Municipal Human Development Index MHDI: 0.731
State ranking: 143 (out of 242 municipalities)
National ranking: 2,414 (out of 5,507 municipalities)

Economy
The economy is based on cattle raising and agriculture. There are plantations of corn, rice, and soybeans. There are several small industries producing furniture, lumber, and clothes.

Economic data for 2007
Industrial units: 20
Retail commercial units: 123
Banking institutions: Banco do Brasil S.A. 
Dairies: Cooperativa Mista dos Prod. de Leite de Morrinhos Ltda. 
Automobiles: 1,114 in 2007

Main agricultural activities
Cattle raising: 75,140 head (2006)
Agriculture: cotton, rice, sugarcane (1,125 hectares), oranges, corn (4,000 hectares), soybeans (7,000 hectares), and tomatoes.
Number of farms: 562
Agricultural area: 83,013
Planted area: 19,300
Area in natural pasture: 45,292
Workers in agriculture: 1,800

Education and health
Literacy rate: 85.5% (2000)
Infant mortality rate: 25.29 in 1,000 live births (2000)
Schools: 13 (2006)
Students: 3,428
Hospitals: 3 (02/2007)
Walk-in clinics: 1

History
The town began with the construction of the highway between Goiânia and Cuiabá, Mato Grosso in 1958. First came a restaurant, a "churrascaria" (steakhouse), and then other people began to arrive. There was no donation of lands; the landowners created the lots themselves. The town name comes from a coconut tree, the indaiá, which grows nearby. Indiara belonged to three municipalities: Edéia, Jandaia, and Palmeira de Goiás and was dismembered to create a district and a municipality in 1983.

See also 
 List of municipalities in Goiás
Microregions of Goiás

References

Municipalities in Goiás